Cerasicoccus is a Gram-negative, non-motile, obligately aerobic and chemoheterotrophic bacterial genus from the family Puniceicoccaceae.

See also
 List of bacterial orders
 List of bacteria genera

References

Verrucomicrobiota
Bacteria genera
Taxa described in 2007